John Alford may refer to:

Politicians
John Alford (MP for Hedon) (died 1600), Member of Parliament (MP) for Hedon
John Alford (Parliamentarian) (c. 1590–1649), MP for New Shoreham in the Long Parliament
John Alford (died 1691) (1645–1691), MP for Midhurst and Bramber

Others
John Alford (lutenist) (fl. 16th c.), English lutenist and translator of a treatise on the lute
John Alford (actor) (born 1971), Scottish-born English actor
John Alford (cricketer) (born 1941), English cricketer
John Alford (professor) (1686–1761), established chair at Harvard
John M. Alford (1915–1988), U.S. Navy admiral
John Alford (priest) (1919–1995), Church of England priest
John R. Alford (fl. 1980s–2020s), American political scientist
John Alford (born 1939), member of The Allisons